Saint Eulalia is an oil painting on canvas in the Pre-Raphaelite style, created in 1885 by English artist John William Waterhouse, depicting the aftermath of the death of Eulalia of Mérida. It is currently housed at Tate Britain.

History
A very daring composition, this is one of Waterhouse's most unusual, and consequently most striking, oil paintings. The corpse is dramatically foreshortened, and the snow contrasts with that of Eulalia's naked flesh – the 12-year-old girl seems singularly out of place for a Waterhouse picture. His choice of configuration – situating the corpse across the front and leaving so much of the central canvas unoccupied – was risky but it worked: by placing all the background figures in the distance, he concentrated the viewer's gaze on the naked body. The nudity was also groundbreaking for Waterhouse – and something that could have laid him open to criticism – but his sensitive handling of the subject, the youth of the saint, and the historical context of the painting allowed him to escape the critics' pen. The eye is also led to the murdered girl by the angle of the Roman guard's spear, pointing to the ropes that had bound her to the stake.

According to legend, the snow was believed to have been sent by God as a shroud to cover the saint's nakedness; the dove, seen flying upwards near the crowd of mourners, is indicative of Eulalia's soul rising to Heaven, having flown out of her mouth.

See also
List of paintings by John William Waterhouse

References

Further reading
.
.
Noakes, Aubrey, Waterhouse. John William Waterhouse, Chaucer Press, 2004.
.
Trippi, Peter, J.W. Waterhouse, Phaidon Press, 2005.

External links
St Eulalia at Tate
St Eulalia at JohnWaterhouse.com.
John William Waterhouse.net 
John William Waterhouse (The Art and Life of JW Waterhouse)
John William Waterhouse (Comprehensive Painting Gallery)
John William Waterhouse Style and Technique
Waterhouse at Tate Britain
Ten Dreams Galleries
John William Waterhouse in the "History of Art"
 Butler's Lives of the Saints – Saint Eulalia of Mérida from catholicforum

Saint Eulalia
Saint Eulalia
Ante-Nicene Christian martyrs
Paintings of saints
Christian art about death
Saint Eulalia
Collection of the Tate galleries
Birds in art